Mettah is a locality in Humboldt County, California.

The region of Metta was settled by Yurok since about the 14th century. During the gold rush of 1850, the Yurok were faced with disease and massacres by white settlers. Mettah was established as a post during the summer of 1872 to preserve the peace between the settlers and Indians in the area. The post was located at the Metta Indian village situated below the juncture of Mettah Creek and the Klamath River in Humboldt County. A post office operated at Mettah from 1924 to 1925.

References

Further reading

Former settlements in Humboldt County, California